United Nations Security Council Resolution 384, adopted on December 22, 1975, noted statements from the representatives of Portugal, Indonesia and East Timor and recognized the right of the people of East Timor to self-determination and independence in accordance with the Charter.  The Council expressed its grave concern with the deterioration of the situation in East Timor, deplored the intervention of the armed forces of Indonesia in that nation and expressed its regret that Portugal did not discharge fully its responsibilities as administering Power.

The Resolution then calls upon all states to respect the territorial integrity of East Timor as well as the inalienable right of its people to self-determination and called upon the Government of Indonesia to withdraw all its forces from the territory without delay.  The Council called on the Government of Portugal, as administering Power, to co-operate fully with the UN as well as urging all states and other parties to co-operate fully with the UN's efforts to achieve a peaceful solution to the situation and to facilitate the decolonization of the territory.  The Resolution then requests the Secretary-General urgently send a special representative to East Timor for the purpose of making an on-the-spot assessment of the existing situation and of establishing contact with all the parties in the Territory and to submit recommendation to the Council as soon as possible.

See also
 History of East Timor
 List of United Nations Security Council Resolutions 301 to 400 (1971–1976)

References
Text of the Resolution at undocs.org

External links
 

 0384
 0384
 0384
 0384
1975 in East Timor
Indonesian occupation of East Timor
Indonesia–Portugal relations
December 1975 events